Shaun Butler (born Goldie LeShaun Butler) is an American BMX rider. Also known as the "Michael Jordan of BMX". He is an 3X XGAMES BMX Professional Athlete, and MTV Sports Music Festival Winner.

He was born to Gwen Butler on June 29, 1976, in Fullerton, California. Butler has been riding professionally since 1993, and is one of ten professionals featured in the Dave Mirra games on PlayStation and PlayStation 2. His sponsors include Vans Shoes, DC Shoes, Airwalk, Puma, Fox Racing, Acclaim Entertainment and Bell Sports. He was voted as one of the Top 25 Most Influential Riders of the 90's Ride BMX.

References

External links
Shaun Butler at 23Mag BMX
Shaun Butler at KHE Bikes

BMX riders
American male cyclists
Living people
1976 births